The 2014 United States Senate election in New Jersey was held on November 4, 2014, to elect a member of the United States Senate to represent the State of New Jersey. Incumbent Democratic Senator Cory Booker, first elected in a special election the previous year, defeated Republican nominee Jeff Bell to win a first full term in office. This is the last time that Somerset County voted Republican in a statewide election.

Democratic primary

Candidates

Declared 
 Cory Booker, incumbent U.S. Senator

Withdrew 
 Antonio Sabas, candidate for the U.S. Senate in 2013 (ran as an independent)

Declined 
 Rob Andrews, U.S. Representative and candidate for the U.S. Senate in 2008
 Robert M. Gordon, state senator
 Patrick J. Kennedy, former U.S. Representative from Rhode Island
 Beth Mason, Hoboken City Councilwoman
 Bill Pascrell, U.S. Representative
 Ronald Rice, state senator
 Stephen M. Sweeney, president of the New Jersey Senate

Polling

Results

Republican primary 
2013 nominee Steve Lonegan announced in his concession speech that he would not run again for the seat in the 2014 race. The top-tier candidates for the Republican primary, Thomas Kean Jr. and Jay Webber also declined to run in early January 2014, leaving Jon Bramnick and Michael J. Doherty as the remaining candidates with established credentials and fundraising abilities able to start a United States Senate campaign. On January 9, 2014, Brian D. Goldberg, a West Orange resident and New Jersey businessman, announced that he would seek the Republican nomination. The following week, on January 17, 2014, both Bramnick and Doherty announced that they would not be running for United States Senate.

On January 27, 2014, Freehold Township businessman Richard J. "Rich" Pezzullo announced his candidacy for the Republican nomination. Pezzullo had previously run for the US Senate in 1996 as the Conservative Party candidate. On February 4, 2014, conservative political consultant Jeff Bell announced his bid for the nomination. Bell was the nominee for the Senate in 1978, having defeated incumbent senator Clifford Case in the Republican primary and was an unsuccessful candidate for the Republican nomination in 1982. Ramapo College professor Murray Sabrin, who ran for the Senate in 2000 and 2008, announced another run on February 13. Former FBI agent Robert Turkavage, who ran as an Independent candidate for the U.S. Senate in 2012, had declared his candidacy. However, he got stuck in a traffic jam when he attempted to turn in his petitions shortly before the deadline, and was forced to withdraw.

On March 4, Richard Pezzullo won the Union County Convention on the first ballot, going on to then win the line in Camden County and Republican stronghold Monmouth County. Opponent Brian Goldberg won the party lines in conventions in Ocean, Atlantic, Cumberland, Mercer, and Somerset Counties. Murray Sabrin won only the Middlesex line, and Jeffrey Bell made no convention appearances and contested no lines. Three candidates – Brian Goldberg, Richard Pezzullo and Murray Sabrin – claimed the Burlington county line, though only Goldberg claimed to have won the line. Goldberg was given the county line with no convention in Essex, Passaic, and Hudson Counties. Robert Turkavage won the convention in Hunterdon County, but the line transferred to Goldberg after Turkavage dropped out of the race.

Jeff Bell received significant support from the conservative American Principles Fund, who ran a direct mail operation that cost over $80,000, and the National Organization for Marriage, a conservative traditional marriage group, who paid for $6,000 of automated calling.

Candidates

Declared 
 Jeff Bell, political consultant, nominee for the U.S. Senate in 1978 and candidate for the U.S. Senate in 1982
 Brian D. Goldberg, businessman
 Richard J. "Rich" Pezzullo, businessman and perennial candidate
 Murray Sabrin, professor at Ramapo College and perennial candidate

Withdrew 
 Robert Turkavage, former FBI agent and Independent candidate for the U.S. Senate in 2012

Declined 
 Jeffrey Chiesa, former U.S. Senator
 Jack Ciattarelli, state assemblyman
 Roger Daley, former Middlesex County Freeholder, former judge on the New Jersey Superior Court and candidate for Middlesex County Freeholder in 2013
 Alieta Eck, former president of the Association of American Physicians and Surgeons, founder of the Zarephath Health Center and candidate for the U.S. Senate in 2013
 Scott Garrett, U.S. Representative
 Jon Hanson, former chairman of the New Jersey Sports and Exposition Authority
 Chris Isola, former Marine
 Thomas Kean Jr., Minority Leader of the New Jersey Senate and nominee for U.S. Senate in 2006
 Joe Kyrillos, state senator and nominee for the U.S. Senate in 2012
 Susanne LaFrankie, former television news reporter
 Frank LoBiondo, U.S. Representative
 Steve Lonegan, state director of Americans for Prosperity, former mayor of Bogota, candidate for governor in 2005 and 2009 and nominee for the U.S. Senate in 2013
 Bill Palatucci, attorney and member of the Republican National Committee
 Joe J. Plumeri, businessman
 Geraldo Rivera, talk show host
 David Samson, chairman of the Port Authority of New York and New Jersey and former New Jersey Attorney General
 Jay Webber, state assemblyman

Results

General election

Debates 
 Complete video of debate, October 24, 2014

Fundraising

Endorsements

Predictions

Polling 

With Andrews

With Booker

With Bradley

With Lautenberg

With Pallone

Results

County results

Results by congressional district
Booker won 7 of the 12 congressional districts, including one that elected a Republican.

See also 
 United States Senate special election in New Jersey, 2013
 2014 United States Senate elections
 2014 United States elections

References

External links 
 U.S. Senate elections in New Jersey, 2014 at Ballotpedia
 Campaign contributions at OpenSecrets
 Cory Booker for Senate
 Jeff Bell for Senate

New Jersey
2014
United States Senate
Cory Booker